Godachinamalaki is a village in Belagavi district in the southern state of Karnataka, India. It lies at an altitude of 660 metres (2,170 feet) above sea level.

Godchinamalaki Falls
The village is famous for Godchinamalaki Falls (near Gokak Falls) on Markandeya river, before reaching its confluence into the Ghataprabha River at Gokak

References

Villages in Belagavi district